Salina-Gunnison Airport  is a public-use airport located five nautical miles (9 km) northeast of the central business district of Salina, a city in Sevier County, Utah, United States. It is owned by the cities of Salina and Gunnison.

Facilities and aircraft 
It has one asphalt paved runway designated 2/20 which measures 3,855 by 60 feet (1,175 x 18 m). For the 12-month period ending December 31, 2007, the airport had 2,052 aircraft operations, all of which were general aviation. At that time, there were 7 aircraft based at the airport, all single-engine.

References

External links 
 

Airports in Utah
Buildings and structures in Sevier County, Utah
Transportation in Sevier County, Utah